The 2019 Badminton Asia Mixed Team Championships were the second edition of the Badminton Asia Mixed Team Championships which was held at the Queen Elizabeth Stadium in Hong Kong from 19 to 24 March 2019. It was organised by Badminton Asia and Hong Kong Badminton Association. The event was also known as the Tong Yun Kai Cup 2019.

Medalists

Tournament
The 2019 Badminton Asia Mixed Team Championships officially crowned the best mixed national badminton teams in Asia. 11 teams, lacking two teams from previous edition entered the tournament.

Venue
The tournament was held at Queen Elizabeth Stadium in Hong Kong.

Seeds
The seeding were as follows:

Draw
The draw was held at World Trade Centre Club on 28 February 2019. The group stage consisted of one group with two teams and three groups each with three teams. The first seeded team, Japan, was preassigned to Group A, while the second seeded team, China, was preassigned to Group D.

Squads

Group stage

Group A

 Japan vs. Hong Kong

Group B

 Chinese Taipei vs. Singapore

 India vs. Singapore

 Chinese Taipei vs. India

Group C

 Indonesia vs. Sri Lanka

 Thailand vs. Sri Lanka

 Indonesia vs. Thailand

Group D

 China vs. Macau

 Malaysia vs. Macau

 China vs. Malaysia

Knockout stage

Quarterfinals

Semifinals

Final

References

External links
 Tong Yun Kai Cup 2019

 
Asia Champ
Badminton Asia Team Championships
2019 in Hong Kong sport
Badminton Asia Mixed Team Championships
Asia
Badminton Asia Team Championships